Transient receptor potential cation channel subfamily M member 1 is a protein that in humans is encoded by the TRPM1 gene.

Function 

The protein encoded by this gene is a member of the transient receptor potential (TRP) family of non-selective cation channels. It is expressed in the retina, in a subset of bipolar cells termed ON bipolar cells. These cells form synapses with either rods or cones, collecting signals from them. In the dark, the signal arrives in the form of the neurotransmitter glutamate, which is detected by a G protein-coupled receptor (GPCR) signal transduction cascade. Detection of glutamate by the GPCR Metabotropic glutamate receptor 6 results in closing of the TRPM1 channel. At the onset of light, glutamate release is halted and mGluR6 is deactivated; this results in opening of the TRPM1 channel, influx of sodium and calcium, and depolarization of the bipolar cell. 
 
In addition to the retina, TRPM1 is also expressed in melanocytes, which are melanin-producing cells in the skin. The expression of TRPM1 is inversely correlated with melanoma aggressiveness, suggesting that it might suppress melanoma metastasis. However, subsequent work showed that a microRNA located in an intron of the TRPM1 gene, rather than the TRPM1 protein itself, is responsible for the tumor suppressor function. The expression of both TRPM1 and the microRNA are regulated by the Microphthalmia-associated transcription factor.

Clinical significance 

Mutations in TRPM1 are associated with congenital stationary night blindness in humans  and  coat spotting patterns in Appaloosa horses.

See also 
 TRPM

References

External links 
 

Ion channels